James Burton  (22 September 1786 – 22 February 1862) (formerly Haliburton and latterly Haliburton) was an early British Egyptologist, known for his pioneering exploration and mapping of the Valley of the Kings, during which he became the first individual of the modern age to enter KV5; his pioneering excavations at Karnak, during which he discovered the Karnak king list; and his excavations at Medinet Habu, during which he was part of the team that discovered TT391.

Birth and family
James was the fourth child and second son of property developer James Burton (formerly James Haliburton) and Elizabeth Westley (12 December 1761 – 14 January 1837), of Loughton, Essex, daughter of John and Mary Westley. The son was christened 'James Haliburton' but his father changed the family surname to Burton in 1794. The son James then changed his surname to Burton also, although he was the only member of the family to subsequently change his surname back to Haliburton (in 1838). He was an older brother of the architect Decimus Burton, the physician Henry Burton, and the gunpowder manufacturer William Ford Burton.

On his father's side, his great-great grandparents were Rev. James Haliburton (1681–1756) and Margaret Eliott, daughter of Sir William Eliott, 2nd Baronet, and aunt of George Augustus Eliott, 1st Baron Heathfield. Decimus was descended from John Haliburton (1573–1627), from whom Sir Walter Scott, 1st Baronet could trace his descent on the maternal side. He was a cousin of the American judge and author Thomas Chandler Haliburton, of whom he was a close friend in London between 1838 and 1844, and thence of the lawyer and anthropologist Robert Grant Haliburton and Arthur Lawrence Haliburton, 1st Baron Haliburton.

James was educated at Tonbridge School, Trinity College, Cambridge (BA, 1810: MA, 1815), and Lincoln's Inn.

Egyptology
Between 1815 and 1822, Burton worked for the architect Sir John Soane, and travelled in Italy with Soane's secretary, Charles Humphreys, where he met Egyptologists Sir John Gardner Wilkinson, Edward William Lane, and Sir William Gell. His circle of Egyptologists also included Robert Hay and Joseph Bonomi the Younger. Burton lived in Egypt from 1820 to 1834, where he enjoyed marsala, rum, brandy, opium, and the company of slave girls.

In 1820, he was part of the team that first discovered TT391. In 1822, despite having no mineralogical knowledge, he was invited by Pasha Mohammed Ali to work as a mineralogist in the Geological Survey of Egypt. He left in 1824 and started to investigate the ancient monuments of Egypt. In 1825, he travelled south on the Nile journeying to Abu Simbel. He spent several months in Thebes, excavating at Medinet Habu, Karnak and in several of the tombs in the Valley of the Kings. In 1824, he made the first attempt to excavate KV20 and cleared the tomb's first chamber. In 1825, he mapped KV21. He explored also KV26, KV9, KV19, and KV2. In 1825, he became the first person to enter KV5, but only partially explored the first few chambers. In 1825, he discovered the Karnak king list. Between 1825 and 1828 Burton published Excerpta Hieroglyphica, a volume of hieroglyphic inscriptions.

Little is known of Burton's activities between 1825 and 1834: he disappeared into the Egyptian desert for nine years until his father stopped his allowance and he was compelled to return to London in 1834. None of his explorations from this period have been published, but the papers of his Egyptologist companion George Greenough, which are kept at University College, London, provide information about Burton's life: "Besides his black slaves before mentioned he has a young Greek purchased by a Scotch renegade by the name of Osman", wrote Sheffield, another Egyptologist. At a birthday celebration for Charles Humphrey, Burton drank 'till he fell off his chair'. Burton was described as having 'a superb French bed with a long looking glass' and spending almost all of his time in 'coffee, smoking and drinking spiritous mixtures' in 'his divan - his harem'. Burton contracted ophthalmia, lumbago, liver problems, and a scorbutic infection, and consumed opium 'to so great a degree' that his friends feared his 'speedy madness or death'. Burton lost weight and expected to live no longer than five years: one of his friends wrote of him, 'He is reduced to a mere skeleton'.

James returned to England on Christmas Day 1835 with various animals, servants and slaves including Andreana, a Greek slave girl whom he had purchased in Egypt and subsequently married, as a consequence of which he was disowned by the Burton family.

However, Burton impressed the daughter of Thomas Chandler Haliburton, who wrote, in 1839, "Mr James I admire very much. He is one of the most well-bred persons I saw &... decidedly the flower of the flock".

Thomas Chandler Haliburton asked Burton to check the proofs of his work Letter Bag of the Great Western, with which Burton was unimpressed, in 1839, and those of the third series of The Clockmaker in 1840. The pair travelled together to Scotland to investigate their common ancestry, and intended to tour Canada and the United States of America together.

Auctioning of property
Subsequent to his death, Burton's notebooks, containing drawings of Egyptian antiquities and plans of monuments, were presented to the British Museum by his brother Decimus Burton. These are useful as they can be compared to the condition of the archaeological sites in Egypt today.

James also collected Egyptian antiquities, most of which were auctioned at Sotheby's in 1836 to repay his debts. The only item of his collection which was not auctioned was a mummy and coffin, now in the Liverpool Museum.

He was a Fellow of the Geological Society of London.

Burton is buried near the centre of Dean Cemetery in Edinburgh. His epitaph reads "a zealous investigator in Egypt of its language and antiquities".

References

Sources

External link

1786 births
1862 deaths
19th-century British archaeologists
19th-century English architects
19th-century English male writers
Alumni of Trinity College, Cambridge
Archaeologists from London
English Egyptologists
English male non-fiction writers
English orientalists
Fellows of the Geological Society of London
People educated at Tonbridge School
Abu Simbel